Montreal East was a federal electoral district in Quebec, Canada, that was represented in the House of Commons of Canada from 1867 to 1892.

It was created by the British North America Act, 1867. It consisted of the St. Lewis Ward, St. James Ward and the St. Mary's Ward. It was abolished in 1892 when it was redistributed into St. James, St. Lawrence and St. Mary ridings.

Members of Parliament

This riding elected the following Members of Parliament:

Election results

See also 

 List of Canadian federal electoral districts
 Past Canadian electoral districts

External links 
 Parliament of Canada
 Riding history from the Library of Parliament

Former federal electoral districts of Quebec